Highway 101 was an American country music band founded in 1986 in Los Angeles, California. The initial lineup consisted of Paulette Carlson (lead vocals), Jack Daniels (guitar), Curtis Stone (bass guitar, vocals), and Scott "Cactus" Moser (drums). Prior to the band's founding, Carlson was a solo artist. With her as lead vocalist, the band recorded three albums for Warner Bros. Records Nashville and charted ten consecutive Top Ten hits on the Hot Country Songs chart, four of which went to number one. After Carlson left in 1990 to pursue a solo career, the band recorded a fourth album for Warner with Nikki Nelson on lead vocals before exiting the label. One album each followed on Liberty, Intersound, and Free Falls Records under various lineups.

History
Carlson founded Highway 101 in 1986 in Los Angeles, California, with guitarist Jack Daniels, bassist Curtis Stone (son of publisher, musician & singer Cliffie Stone), and drummer Scott "Cactus" Moser, all three of whom were session musicians. Stone and Moser (and Cliffie Stone) had appeared in the 1986 film Back to School as members of a bar band. Before Highway 101, Carlson recorded as a solo singer on RCA Records. She made three appearances on the Hot Country Songs chart for RCA: "You Gotta Get to My Heart (Before You Lay a Hand on Me)", "I'd Say Yes", and "Can You Fool" reached No. 65, No. 67 and No. 72, respectively.

1986–1990
In 1986, the band signed with Warner Bros. Records Nashville, debuting with the single "Some Find Love". However, it failed to chart and was withdrawn due to the band's dissatisfaction with its country pop sound. They followed up in January 1987 with the single "The Bed You Made for Me", which Carlson wrote. The song spent twenty-four weeks on the Hot Country Songs chart, reaching a peak of No. 4. Following it were "Whiskey, If You Were a Woman" at No. 2 and two straight No. 1s: "Somewhere Tonight" (written by Rodney Crowell and Harlan Howard) and "Cry, Cry, Cry". After the chart success, Highway 101 was nominated and won the award for Vocal Group of the Year at the 1988 ACM and CMA Awards.

101² followed in 1988. Its first single, "(Do You Love Me) Just Say Yes". became the band's third straight No. 1 single; following it were the Top 10 hits "All the Reasons Why", "Setting Me Up", and "Honky Tonk Heart", at No. 5, No. 7 and No. 6 respectively. The next year's Paint the Town accounted for the band's final Number One, "Who's Lonely Now", followed by "Walkin', Talkin', Cryin', Barely Beatin' Broken Heart" (originally released by Johnnie Wright) and "This Side of Goodbye". A Greatest Hits album in 1990 included the No. 14 single "Someone Else's Trouble Now".

1990–Present: Departure of Carlson
In late 1990, Carlson left the band for a solo career on Capitol Records. Her solo debut album, Love Goes On, produced only one top 40 hit in "I'll Start with You". Carlson's replacement on lead vocals was Nikki Nelson, who first appeared on 1991's Bing Bang Boom. Although this album's title track made the Top 20, the other singles from it were less successful: "The Blame" reached No. 31, "Baby, I'm Missing You" peaked at No. 22, and "Honky Tonk Baby" fell short of the Top 40. Daniels left the band in 1992.  After this album, the band left Warner Bros. for Liberty Records. The only release for this label, The New Frontier, included the band's final chart entry, "You Baby You", which peaked at No. 67.

Carlson and Daniels returned in 1996 for the album Reunited, released via Intersound Records. "Where’d You Get Your Cheatin’ From" and "It Must Be Love" were released as singles. In 1998, Carlson and Daniels would both depart Highway 101 once again.

In 1999, Moser (who was absent from the Reunion album) returned and with Stone, reformed Highway 101 with Charlie White and new vocalist Chrislynn Lee. With FreeFalls, an independent record label, Highway 101 released its seventh studio album, Big Sky. The album also included "There Goes My Love", previously recorded with Carlson (1988) and "I Wonder Where the Love Goes", previously recorded with Nelson (1993).

White departed in 2002 and was replaced with Justin Weaver. Lee soon departed as well, and Nelson returned in 2006. In 2007, Weaver departed and was replaced by Andy Gurley. In December 2010, Highway 101 appeared on the Grand Ole Opry and released a special Christmas DVD entitled "Christmas On Highway 101". The new DVD featured professionally filmed live performances and guest appearances by country music notables such as Wynonna Judd, to whom Moser is married.

In August 2012, Moser was involved in a motorcycle accident which resulted in the amputation of his left leg above the knee.

Members

Discography

Studio albums

Compilation albums

Singles

Guest singles

Music videos

References

Country music groups from California
Liberty Records artists
Musical groups established in 1986
Musical groups from Los Angeles
Warner Records artists
1986 establishments in California